CLUSTER, abbreviation of Collaboration for Leadership in Urban Science Teaching, Evaluation, and Research. It is a collaboration among the City College of New York (CCNY), the New York Hall of Science (NYHoS) and the Center for Advanced Study in Education at the City University of New York (CUNY). The fellowship is supported by the National Science Foundation.

The CLUSTER fellowship is opened to undergraduate science degree-seeking students who have a strong desire for teaching and learning. Prospective fellows should consult their advisers in their majors before applying as the fellowship is coursework and time demanding.

References

External links
 Discussion Forum for CLUSTER Fellows.

Science education in the United States